Bacillus halodurans is a rod-shaped, Gram-positive, motile and spore-forming bacterium found in soil.  In a genomic comparison with Bacillus subtilis, B. halodurans strain C-125 - originally an unclassified Bacillus strain - was found to contain unique genes and sigma factors that may have aided its adaptation to more alkaline environments.

This species has been recently transferred into the genus Alkalihalobacillus.  The correct nomenclature is Alkalihalobacillus halodurans.

Bacteriocin production
B. halodurans produces a bacteriocin, haloduracin, that may be useful as a lantibiotic and could be produced in large quantities by solid state fermentation.

Genome structure
B. halodurans has a genome that contains 4.2 Mbp with 4,066 protein coding genes.

References

External links
Type strain of Bacillus halodurans at BacDive -  the Bacterial Diversity Metadatabase

halodurans
Bacteria described in 1973